The Pendragon Cycle is a series of historical fantasy books based on Arthurian legend, written by Stephen R. Lawhead. The cycle was originally planned as a four-book series, but the original publisher opted to stop after the first three books, resulting in an abrupt ending to Arthur and the existence of many unexplored stories and plotlines. Lawhead moved to a new publisher a few years later. It was decided to expand on the trilogy by finishing the series, and two additional books were planned. The later book Avalon is not considered to be a true addition to the cycle but rather a "related semi-sequel" to round out the "Once and Future King" aspect of the legend. The film and television rights to the series were purchased by DailyWire+ in November 2022.

Overview 
The series is a work of fiction that takes place in the 5th and 6th centuries and attempts to present the Arthurian legends in a historical setting while presenting the story with a reality the reader can connect with. Lawhead bases his stories on the Mabinogion, the History of the Kings of Britain and other works of Geoffrey of Monmouth, the writings of Taliesin, Gildas, and Nennius, and several other legends that he manages to interweave into the Arthurian legend.

The books, with the exception of Taliesin and Avalon, are narrated in the first-person, and, except for Pendragon, Grail, and Avalon, are each split into three sections (Pendragon has four, Grail one, and Avalon five). Merlin and Pendragon are narrated by Myrddin (Merlin). The first third of Arthur is narrated by Pelleas, the second by Bedwyr (Bedivere), and the third by Aneirin/Gildas. Grail is mostly narrated by Gwalchavad (Galahad), with a short narration by Morgian (Morgan le Fay) at the beginning of most chapters. Taliesin follows Taliesin and Charis (the Lady of the Lake), alternating in each chapter; Avalon mostly follows James Stuart (the reborn Arthur), Merlin, and the fictional Prime Minister Thomas Waring.

Locations 
A listing of the locations and place names used in the series, and their modern equivalents (see also List of Roman place names in Britain):

Characters 
Many historical personas (some already included in the Arthurian legend) exist in the cycle, alongside less "factual" characters: Taliesin, Magnus Maximus, Theodosius, Ambrosius Aurelianus, Vortigern, Constantine III, Myrddin Wyllt, Clovis I, Gwyddno Garanhir, Elffin ap Gwyddno, Horsa, Hengest, Cerdic, Aelle, Gildas, and Aneirin (in the series, it is revealed that the last two are the same person; born with the name Aneirin, he changes it to Gildas after Arthur's death).

Novels 
Taliesin (1987)
Merlin (1988)
Arthur (1989)
Pendragon (1994)
Grail (1997)
Avalon (1999)

The series proceeds as told in the following descriptions:

Taliesin 
Tells simultaneously the story of the fall of Atlantis, the subsequent travel of Princess Charis and her family to Ynys Prydein (Britain), and the discovery and training of Taliesin as a druid/bard. The two eventually meet and marry, and Myrddin (Merlin) is born just weeks before a tragedy brought about by Charis' jealous half-sister, Morgian.

Merlin 
Narrated by Myrddin. Tells of Myrddin's dual upbringing among the druids and Christian priests, his capture and mystical training among the Hill Folk, and his brief time as a king of Dyfed. He experiences a doomed romance with Princess Ganieda and long years of madness as a wild man of the woods before finding his destiny.

Arthur 
Narrated by Pelleas (first third), Bedwyr (second third), and Aneirin (last third). Tells of Arthur and Myrddin's attempt to create the paradisaical "Kingdom of Summer". Arthur is made Duke and Battlechief of Britain after drawing the sword of Maximus from a stone, but must fight back the Saecsens and other barbarian invaders and unite the peoples of Britain before he can be accepted as High King.

Pendragon 
Narrated by Myrddin. Tells of an invasion of Ireland and Britain by the Vandal army of Twrch Trwyth, the Black Boar, and a subsequent plague that sweeps across Britain, threatening Arthur's Kingdom of Summer while it is still newborn.

Grail 
Narrated by Gwalchavad (majority) and Morgian (short narration at each chapter's beginning). Tells of Arthur building a shrine to house the Holy Grail and how the beautiful and mysterious Morgaws joins his court. When treachery follows, Arthur's warriors brave the Wasteland of Lyonesse to retrieve the sacred relic.

Avalon: The Return of King Arthur 
In Portugal, the reprobate King Edward the Ninth has died by his own hand. In England, the British monarchy teeters on the edge of total destruction.

And in the Scottish Highlands, a mystical emissary named Mr. Embries—better known as “Merlin”—informs a young captain that he is next in line to the throne. James Arthur Stuart is not the commoner he has always believed himself to be; he is Arthur, the legendary King of Summer, reborn. The road to England's salvation is dangerous, however, and powerful enemies wait in ambush. Arthur is not the only one who has returned from the mists of legend, and Merlin's magic is not the only sorcery that has survived the centuries.

References 

Book series introduced in 1987
Modern Arthurian fiction
Fantasy novel series
Historical novels by series
Atlantis in fiction
Works based on Merlin
Novels set in Roman Britain
Novels set in sub-Roman Britain
Taliesin